William Hussey may refer to:

Politicians
 William Hussey (died ?1531) (died 1531), MP for Stamford
William Hussey (died 1556), MP for Grantham
 William Hussey (died 1570) (1524–1570), MP for Scarborough
 William Hussey (English diplomat) (1642–1691), English ambassador to the Ottoman Empire
 William Hussey (died 1813) (1725–1813), MP for Hindon, Salisbury and St Germans

Others
 William Hussey (astronomer) (1862–1926), American astronomer
 William Hussey (judge) (1443–1495), English Chief Justice
 William Hussey (writer), English children's author
 William Clive Hussey (1858–1923), British Army officer

See also 
 William H. Huse (died 1888), American newspaper publisher and politician